Bikhuyeh (also Romanized as Bīkhūyeh and Bikhooyeh; also known as Bekhūyeh-ye ‘Olyā, Bekhūyeh-ye Soflā, Benjūyeh, Bīkhū, Bīkhūyeh-ye ‘Olyā, Bīkhūyeh-ye Soflā, Bīkūyeh, Qal‘eh Bikūi, Qal‘eh-e Bīkūbī, and Qal‘eh-e Bīkū’ī) is a village in Darz and Sayeban Rural District, in the Central District of Larestan County, Fars Province, Iran. At the 2006 census, its population was 309, in 61 families.

References 

Populated places in Larestan County